Cyiza is a monotypic snout moth genus described by Francis Walker in 1864. Its only species, Cyiza punctalis, described by the same author in the same year, is found in Malaysia.

References

Phycitinae
Monotypic moth genera
Moths of Asia